Gorllwyn is a subsidiary summit of Drygarn Fawr, located on a remote moorland plateau of the Cambrian Mountains. The summit is grassy and is surrounded by peat bog. There is a shelter cairn and a trig point.

To the west is Drygarn Fawr, its large cairns making it a very distinctive feature in an otherwise featureless plateau. Drygarn Fawr is separated from Gorllwyn by the pass of Bwlch y Ddau Faen. To the east the plateau continues towards Y Gamriw. Radnor Forest lies further to the east.

References

External links
 www.geograph.co.uk : photos of Drygarn Fawr and surrounding area

Elenydd
Mountains and hills of Powys
Hewitts of Wales
Nuttalls